Ocypode fabricii is a species of ghost crabs endemic to the coast of northern and western Australia, from Darwin to Shark Bay. They are medium-sized ghost crabs with a squarish body. Like other ghost crabs, one of their claws is much larger than the other. They live in burrows in the intertidal zones of the muddy to sandy beaches of mangrove forests.

See also
Golden ghost crab

References

External links

Ocypodoidea
Crustaceans described in 1837
Taxa named by Henri Milne-Edwards